The 1966 Arab Cup was the third edition of the Arab Cup hosted by Baghdad, Iraq. The host nation and defending Champions Iraq won the title for the 2nd time.

Participated teams 
The 10 participated teams are:

Venues

Squads

Group stage

Group A

Group B 
Oman abandoned their first match against Libya with 10 minutes left from a disputed decision when they started losing 21–0 to Libya, and withdrew from the tournament.

Knock-out stage

Semi-finals

Third place play-off

Final

Goalscorers 
16 goals
  Ali Al-Biski

Notes and references

Notes

References

External links 
 Details in RSSSF

 
Arab Cup, 1966
International association football competitions hosted by Iraq
Arab
Football in Baghdad
Arab
Arab Cup